Stöcker is the name of the following personalities:

 Adolf Stoecker, German theologist, antisemitic politician
 Dean Stoecker, American billionaire, co-founder of Alteryx
 Diana Stöcker, German politician
 Helene Stöcker, German woman's lib activist and pacifist
 Hermann Stöcker, German footballer
 Horst Stöcker, German theoretical physicist

See also 
 Stocker
 Stockert
 Stecker (disambiguation)
 Stacker (disambiguation)

German-language surnames